Vanda Miss Joaquim is the stage name of Azizul Izzy Mahathir, a drag performer who competed on the second season of Drag Race Thailand. She is a Malay Muslim who represented Singapore on the show. She has been described as one of Singapore's most famous drag queens. She operates the House of Miss Joaquim. In 2019, she was a panelist on "All Around the World: International Drag Queens" at RuPaul's DragCon NYC.

Filmography

Television
 Drag Race Thailand (season 2)

Content 

 The Rise of Vanda Miss Joaquim

References

Living people
Drag queens
Malaysian Muslims
People from Singapore
Drag Race Thailand contestants
Year of birth missing (living people)